The 2022 Morelos Open was a professional tennis tournament played on outdoor hard courts. It was the eighth edition of the tournament which was part of the 2022 ATP Challenger Tour. It took place in Cuernavaca, Mexico between 25 April and 1 May 2022.

Singles main draw entrants

Seeds 

 1 Rankings as of 18 April 2022.

Other entrants 
The following players received wildcards into the singles main draw:
  Alex Hernández
  Rodolfo Jauregui Sainz de Rozas
  Rodrigo Pacheco Méndez

The following players received entry from the qualifying draw:
  Elmar Ejupovic
  Benjamin Lock
  Shintaro Mochizuki
  Naoki Nakagawa
  Keegan Smith
  Sun Fajing

Champions

Singles 

 Jay Clarke def.  Adrián Menéndez Maceiras 6–1, 4–6, 7–6(7–5).

Doubles 

 JC Aragone /  Adrián Menéndez Maceiras def.  Nicolás Mejía /  Roberto Quiroz 7–6(7–4), 6–2.

References

2022
Morelos Open
2022 in Mexican tennis
April 2022 sports events in Mexico
May 2022 sports events in Mexico